Labruyère may refer to one of several communes in France:
 Labruyère, Côte-d'Or
 Labruyère, Oise
 Labruyère-Dorsa, Haute-Garonne

See also 
 La Bruyère (disambiguation)